Birgül Oğuz (born 1981, Istanbul) is a Turkish writer. She was born in İstanbul and studied Comparative Literature and Cultural Studies at Istanbul Bilgi University. She also attended the University of Edinburgh in 2006. Currently working towards a PhD in English literature at Boğaziçi University, she also teaches literature at Moda Sahnesi and Nazım Hikmet Academy in Istanbul.

She has published two works of fiction to date: Fasulyenin Bildiği (2007) and Hah (2012). The latter won the 2014 European Union Prize for Literature.

In 2015, she participated in the International Writing Program's Fall Residency at the University of Iowa in Iowa City, Iowa.

References

1981 births
Living people
21st-century Turkish writers
21st-century Turkish women writers
Istanbul Bilgi University alumni
Alumni of the University of Edinburgh
Boğaziçi University alumni
International Writing Program alumni